Oregonite, Ni2FeAs2 is a nickel iron arsenide mineral first described from Josephine Creek, Oregon, United States.

Oregonite crystallises in the hexagonal crystal system and has a Mohs hardness of 5.

Occurrence

Oregonite is known, apart from its type locality, from the Chirnaisky Massif, Russia, associated with hydrothermal nickel minerals (millerite, heazelwoodite) in a metamorphosed ultramafic; from the Skouriatissa mine, Cyprus, associated with VMS mineralisation; and from the Kidd Mine, Timmins, Ontario, Canada within serpentinite-hosted chromite deposits.

References 

Nickel minerals
Iron(II) minerals
Arsenide minerals
Hexagonal minerals